Hajjiabad-e Bostijian (also Romanized as Hajjiabad-e Bostījīān; also known as Bozījān, Buzīdjān, Haji Abad Bostjan, Ḩājjīābād, Ḩājjīābād-e Bosījān, Ḩājjīābād-e Bostejān, and Ḩājjīābād-e Bostījān) is a village in Howmeh Rural District, in the Central District of Damghan County, Semnan Province, Iran. At the 2006 census, its population was 98, in 36 families.

References 

Populated places in Damghan County